Newsome is a ward of Huddersfield in the metropolitan borough of Kirklees, West Yorkshire, England.   It contains over 430 listed buildings that are recorded in the National Heritage List for England.  Of these, one is listed at Grade I, the highest of the three grades, 17 are at Grade II*, the middle grade, and the others are at Grade II, the lowest grade.  The ward is large, and contains the centre of the town of Huddersfield, and areas to the west and south.  This list contains the listed buildings in the centre of the town, namely those within the ring road.  The listed buildings in the outer areas, those within the ward but outside the ring road, are at Listed buildings in Huddersfield (Newsome Ward - outer areas)

Most of the listed buildings in the central area are houses, shops, offices, public buildings, and associated structures.  The other listed buildings include a market cross, public houses and hotels, warehouses, a church, chapels and associated structures, a railway station and structures in the station yard, a railway viaduct, banks, markets, former cinemas, and four telephone kiosks.


Key

Buildings

References

Citations

Sources

Lists of listed buildings in West Yorkshire
Buildings and structures in Huddersfield